Emirati cuisine is the local traditional Arabic cuisine of the United Arab Emirates. It is part of the Eastern Arabian cuisine and shares similarities with cuisines from neighboring countries, such as Omani cuisine and Saudi Arabian cuisine, as well as influences from different Middle Eastern and Asian cuisines. 

As a major international hub, the United Arab Emirates today has a multicultural and variety of cuisines from different parts of the world.

History

Origins

Cultivation of date palms in the area can be traced back to the mid-third millennium BC (commonly referred to as the Umm al-Nar period in the United Arab Emirates) from which many date seeds have been found in Umm al-Nar sites. The presence of grinding stones and fired clay ovens in archaeological sites indicate that grain processing was also performed. Studies of human dental remains dating back to the third millennium shows a high level of attrition which is believed to result from the mastication of dry bread.

Modern history
The cuisine which originated in the area that is now the United Arab Emirates and was previously the Trucial States is formed by a similar Arabic and Middle Eastern cuisine which is consumed in the wider Arabian Peninsula. The food is a mixture of a bedouin diet, consisting of meat and camel milk, a fishermen's diet, consisting mainly of fish common in the Persian gulf, and a farmer's diet, consisting mainly of dates. A blend of these diets as well as a mixture of spices such as cinnamon, saffron, and turmeric formed the basis of the common dishes consumed in the Trucial states region and the current traditional Emirati cuisine.

The traditional food of the United Arab Emirates uses much meat, grain, and dairy. Vegetables that are easy to grow in fertile soil, such as cucumbers and tomatoes, are strongly featured in the diet. Dried lemons, called loomi, are also heavily featured, grown locally, and used in most dishes. Mangos are also grown, usually in the northern emirates in villages such as Masafi. Meats traditionally used are chicken or small fowl, such as Houbara bustards, and goats. As camels are highly prized for their milk and transporting ability, the eating of camel meat is normally reserved for special occasions.

The dishes are usually like stews, as everything is often cooked in a single pot. Saffron, cardamom, turmeric, and thyme are the core flavors used in Emirati cookery. Rice was added to the diet when traders moved to the region. Leaves from indigenous trees, such as the Ghaff, were also used to stuff small birds for enhanced flavor.

Traditional dishes include Maq'louba, Margooga, Harees, Machbous, Frsee'ah, Fireed, Jisheid, and Mishwy.
Breakfast in the UAE usually features breads like raqaq, khameer, and chebab, served with cheese, date syrup, or eggs. These were made over a curved hot plate, resembling a stone, which would have been used by the Bedouins. Balaleat is another dish, but its advent began with the traders, who introduced pasta.

Sweet options include luqeymat, a deep fried ball of pancake batter that is rolled in sesame seeds and then drizzled with date honey. Other desserts include khabeesa, which is flour bread crumbs blended with sugar, cardamom, and saffron or bethitha, a semolina blended with crushed dates, cardamom, and clarified butter.

At the close of the meal, it is usual to serve a red tea infused with mint as a digestive. Other mealtime traditions include a welcome with dates and gahwah (Arabic coffee), which are offered on arrival and are kept available through the guests visit.

Levantine cuisine is sometimes confused as Emirati/Gulf, but shawarma, hummous, tabbouleh and mixed grill, whilst having similar characteristics, are fairly recent additions to the Emirati diet.

Foods and dishes

Seafood has been the mainstay of the Emirati diet for centuries. The United Arab Emirates cuisine is a reflection of an Arabian heritage and exposure to other civilizations over time. As the consumption of pork is forbidden under Muslim law, it is not included in most menus. Hotels frequently have pork substitutes such as beef, chicken, sausage and veal rashers on their breakfast menus. If pork is available, it is clearly labelled as such.

Meat, fish, and rice are the staple foods of the Emirati cuisine. Lamb and mutton are the more favored meats rather than goat, beef, and camel meat. Dates are usually consumed with meals.

Popular beverages are coffee and tea, which can be supplemented with cardamom, saffron, or mint to give it a distinct flavor.

Alcohol is generally only served in hotel restaurants and bars (but not in Sharjah). All nightclubs and golf clubs are permitted to sell alcohol. Specific supermarkets may sell pork in a separate section of the market.

Dishes forming part of the Emirati cuisine include:

 Asida
 Al Jabab bread
 Balaleet
 Bathieth
 Harees
 Jami 
Jasheed
Kabsa
 Khabees
 Khanfroush
 Khamir Bread
 Machboos
 Madroob
 Markouka
 Maqluba
Muhala bread
 Quzi
Salona
 Tharid
Waggafi bread

Beverages

 Camel milk
 Soft drinks
 Tea
 Water
 Juice
 Laban
 Arabic coffee
 Arabic tea

Events

Dubai Food Festival

The inaugural Dubai Food Festival was held from 21 February to 15 March 2014. According to Vision the event was aimed at enhancing and celebrating Dubai's position as the gastronomic capital of the region. The festival was designed to showcase the variety of flavours and cuisines on offer in Dubai featuring the cuisines of over 200 nationalities at the festival.

References

External links
 Emirati Cuisine. Cultures.ae.

 
Middle Eastern cuisine
Arab cuisine